Novinki is a rural locality (a village) in Privodinskoye Urban Settlement of Kotlassky District, Arkhangelsk Oblast, Russia. The population was 3 as of 2010.

Geography 
Novinki is located on the Severnaya Dvina River, 23 km south of Kotlas (the district's administrative centre) by road. Prislon Bolshoy is the nearest rural locality.

References 

Rural localities in Kotlassky District